Ruin (often stylized as RUIN) is an American thrash metal band from Portland, Maine, formed in 2005. Ruin's latest album Rite of Passage debuted in October 2014.

Members

Current 
  Richard Carey – guitar and vocals
  Craig Carey – drums
  Kevin Whitman – guitar
  Todd Biddwell – bass

Former
  Ken Vought – former guitarist (2005–2012)

Discography 
 Hands of Enmity (2007)
 Human Moral Deception (2009)
 Rite of Passage (2014)

References

External links 
Official website

Musical groups established in 2005
American thrash metal musical groups